Soe San Thet Tun (born 1 June 1985) is a Burmese politician and physician who is a Pyithu Hluttaw MP for Myinmu Constituency. He is a member of the National League for Democracy.

Early life and education
Soe San Thet Tun born 1 June 1985 in Myinmu Township, Sagaing Region, Myanmar. He graduated with B.A (Hist:) from Monyaw University and Dip.T.Med (Mdy) from University of Traditional Medicine, Mandalay. His previously worked as a trader. He had served as executive member of NLD Sagaing district.

Political career
He is a member of the National League for Democracy. In the 2015 Myanmar general election, he was elected as a Pyithu Hluttaw MP and elected representative from Myinmu parliamentary constituency.

References

Living people
1985 births
People from Sagaing Region
Members of Pyithu Hluttaw
National League for Democracy politicians